Molla Sartip (also Romanized as Mollā Sartīp; also known as Sartīpābād) is a village in Babuyi Rural District, Basht District, Basht County, Kohgiluyeh and Boyer-Ahmad Province, Iran. At the 2006 census, its population was 113, in 22 families.

References 

Populated places in Basht County